Pir Vali (also Romanized as Pīr Vālī; also known as Pīr ‘Alī) is a village in Qilab Rural District, Alvar-e Garmsiri District, Andimeshk County, Khuzestan Province, Iran. At the 2006 census, its population was 292, in 58 families.

References 

Populated places in Andimeshk County